Iheringichthys megalops, is a species of demersal catfish of the family Pimelodidae that is native to Paraná River basin of Paraguay.

Description
The tip of adpressed dorsal fin comes close to the adipose-fin origin as well as the tip of the pectoral fin is close to the pelvic-fin origin and the tip of pelvic fin reaches the anal-fin origin. It has a distinct serrae on the anterior and especially the posterior pectoral spine margins. It has small spots distributed all over the flank or with spots faint in the posterior portion of body.

References

External links
Morphological development of Hypophthalmus fimbriatus and H. marginatus post-yolk-sac larvae (Siluriformes: Pimelodidae)

Pimelodidae
Catfish of South America
Fish described in 1907